Portrayals of East Asians in American film and theatre has been a subject of controversy. These portrayals have frequently reflected an ethnocentric perception of East Asians rather than realistic and authentic depictions of East Asian cultures, colors, customs, and behaviors.

Yellowface, a form of theatrical makeup used by European-American performers to represent an East Asian person (similar to the practice of blackface used to represent African-American characters), continues to be used in film and theater. In the 21st century alone, Grindhouse (in a trailer parody of the Fu Manchu serials), Balls of Fury, I Now Pronounce You Chuck & Larry, Crank: High Voltage, and Cloud Atlas all feature yellowface or non-East Asian actors as East Asian caricatures.

Early East Asian American film actors

Sessue Hayakawa 
The Japanese actor Sessue Hayakawa began appearing in films around 1914. Signed to Paramount Pictures, he had roles in more than 20 silent films including The Wrath of the Gods (1914) and The Typhoon (1914), and was considered to be a Hollywood sex symbol. When Hayakawa's contract with Paramount expired in 1918, the studio still wanted him to star in an upcoming movie, but Hayakawa turned them down in favor of starting his own company. He was at the height of his popularity during that time. His career in the United States suffered a bit due to the advent of talkies, as he had a heavy Japanese accent. He became unemployable during the World War II era due to anti-Japanese prejudice. He experienced a career revival beginning in 1949 in World War II-themed films, and was nominated for the Academy Award for Best Supporting Actor for his performance in The Bridge on the River Kwai.

Anna May Wong 
Anna May Wong, considered by many to be the first Chinese-American movie star, was acting by the age of 14 and in 1922, at age 17, she became the first Chinese-American to break Hollywood's miscegenation rule playing opposite a white romantic lead in The Toll of the Sea. Even though she was internationally known by 1924, her film roles were limited by stereotype and prejudice. Tired of being both typecast and passed over for lead East Asian character roles in favor of European-American actresses, Wong left Hollywood in 1928 for Europe. Interviewed by Doris Mackie for Film Weekly in 1933, Wong complained about her Hollywood roles: "I was so tired of the parts I had to play." She commented: "There seems little for me in Hollywood, because, rather than real Chinese, producers prefer Hungarians, Mexicans, American Indians for Chinese roles." In 1935, she was considered for the leading role in The Good Earth, which went to German actress Luise Rainer. Wong refused the role of the villainess, a stereotypical Oriental Dragon Lady.

Keye Luke 
Keye Luke was a successful actor, starring as the "Number-One Son" Lee Chan in the popular Charlie Chan films, as well as the original Kato in the 1940s Green Hornet, and Detective James Lee Wong in Phantom of Chinatown (1940), a role previously played by the English actor Boris Karloff.

Philip Ahn 
Korean-American actor Philip Ahn, after rejection for speaking English too well, braved death threats after playing Japanese villains. Ahn would go on to have a prolific career.

Some East and South Asian-American actors nonetheless attempted to start careers. Merle Oberon, an Anglo-Indian, was able to get starring roles after concocting a phony story about her origins and using skin whitening make-up. There were others pioneering East Asian-American actors like Benson Fong (who played the Number Three son in the Charlie Chan films), Victor Sen Yung (who played the Number Two son in the Charlie Chan films), Richard Loo (who also played many Japanese villain roles), Lotus Long (known for her role as Lin Wen opposite Keye Luke in the Phantom of Chinatown), Suzanna Kim, Barbara Jean Wong, Fely Franquelli, Chester Gan, Honorable Wu, Kam Tong, Layne Tom Jr., Maurice Liu, Rudy Robles, Teru Shimada, Willie Fung, Toshia Mori and Wing Foo, who all began their film careers in the 1930s and '40s.

With the number of East Asian-American actors available, author Robert B. Ito wrote an article that described that job protection for Caucasian actors was one reason Asians were portrayed by Caucasians. "With the relatively small percentage of actors that support themselves by acting, it was only logical that they should try to limit the available talent pool as much as possible. One way of doing this was by placing restrictions on minority actors, which, in the case of Asian actors, meant that they could usually only get roles as houseboys, cooks, laundrymen, and crazed war enemies, with the rare "white hero's loyal sidekick" roles going to the big name actors. When the script called for a larger Asian role, it was almost inevitably given to a white actor."

Recent East Asian American film actors 
The 2018 film Crazy Rich Asians starred Constance Wu, Henry Golding, Michelle Yeoh, Gemma Chan, Lisa Lu, Awkwafina, Harry Shum Jr., Ken Jeong, Sonoya Mizuno, Chris Pang, Jimmy O. Yang, Ronny Chieng, Remy Hii, Nico Santos, Jing Lusi and Carmen Soo, among others.

The 2022 film Everything Everywhere All at Once starred Michelle Yeoh as main lead, Stephanie Hsu, Ke Huy Quan, Harry Shum Jr., and James Hong as supporting actors.

European actors who have played East Asian roles

The Welsh American Myrna Loy was the "go-to girl" for any portrayal of Asian characters and was typecast in over a dozen films, while Chinese detective Charlie Chan, who was modeled after Chang Apana, a real-life Chinese Hawaiian detective, was portrayed by several European and European-American actors including Warner Oland, Sidney Toler, and Peter Ustinov. Loy also appeared in yellowface alongside Nick Lucas in The Show of Shows.

The list of actors who have donned yellowface to portray East Asians at some point in their career includes: Lon Chaney Sr., Edward G. Robinson, Paul Muni, Loretta Young, Boris Karloff, Peter Lorre, Anthony Quinn, Shirley MacLaine, Katharine Hepburn, Rita Moreno, Rex Harrison, John Wayne, Mickey Rooney, Marlon Brando, Lupe Vélez, Alec Guinness, Tony Randall, John Gielgud, Max von Sydow, Linda Hunt, Eddie Murphy, David Carradine, Joel Grey, Peter Sellers, Yul Brynner, and many others.

Madame Butterfly
"Madame Butterfly" was originally a short story written by Philadelphia attorney John Luther Long. It was turned into a one-act play, Madame Butterfly: A Tragedy of Japan, by David Belasco. Giacomo Puccini re-made the play into the Italian opera Madama Butterfly, set in 1904. The 1915 silent film version was directed by Sidney Olcott and starred Mary Pickford.

All the versions of Madame Butterfly tell the story of a young Japanese woman who has converted to Christianity (for which she is disowned by her family) and marries Benjamin Franklin Pinkerton, a white lieutenant in the U.S. Navy. For him, the marriage is a temporary convenience, but Butterfly's conversion is sincere, and she takes her marriage vows seriously. Pinkerton's naval duties eventually call him away from Japan. He leaves Butterfly behind and she soon gives birth to their son. Pinkerton eventually meets and marries a white American woman (the fact he stopped paying the rent on Butterfly's house amounted to a divorce under Japanese law at the time). Pinkerton returns to Japan with his new wife, Kate, to claim his son. Butterfly acquiesces to his request, and then kills herself as Pinkerton rushes into the house, too late to stop her. In the story by Long, Butterfly is on the point of killing herself when the presence of her child reminds her of her Christian conversion, and the story ends with Mr and Mrs Pinkerton arriving at the house the next morning to find it completely empty.

Pre-2010s film
Americans have been putting Asian characters into films since 1896; however, it was historically common to hire white actors to portray Asian characters. Although some Asian characters are played by Asian actors in early films that surround an Asian story or setting, most of the main characters are played by white actors, even when the role is written as an Asian character.

Mr. Wu (1913)
Mr. Wu was originally a stage play, written by Harold Owen and Harry M. Vernon. It was first staged in London in 1913, with Matheson Lang in the lead. He became so popular in the role that he starred in a 1919 film version. Lang continued to play Oriental roles (although not exclusively), and his autobiography was titled Mr. Wu Looks Back (1940). The first U.S. production opened in New York on October 14, 1914. The actor Frank Morgan was in the original Broadway cast, appearing under his original name Frank Wupperman.

Lon Chaney Sr. and Renée Adorée were cast in the 1927 film. Cheekbones and lips were built up with cotton and collodion, the ends of cigar holders were inserted into his nostrils, and the long fingernails were constructed from stripes of painted film stock. Chaney used fishskin to fashion an Oriental cast to his eyes and grey crepe hair was used to create the distinctive Fu-Manchu moustache and goatee.

The Forbidden City (1918)
The Forbidden City is a 1918 American silent drama film starring Norma Talmadge and Thomas Meighan and directed by Sidney Franklin. A copy of the film is in the Library of Congress and other film archives.The plot centers around an inter-racial romance between a Chinese princess (Norma Talmadge) and an American. When palace officials discover she has fallen pregnant she is sentenced to death. In the latter part of the film Talmadge plays the now adult daughter of the affair, seeking her father in the Philippines.

Broken Blossoms (1919)
The film Broken Blossoms is based on a short story, "The Chink and the Child", taken from the book Limehouse Nights by Thomas Burke. It was released in 1919, during a period of strong anti-Chinese feeling in the U.S., a fear known as the Yellow Peril. Griffith changed Burke's original story to promote a message of tolerance. In Burke's story, the Chinese protagonist is a sordid young Shanghai drifter pressed into naval service, who frequents opium dens and whorehouses; in the film, he becomes a Buddhist missionary whose initial goal is to spread the dharma of the Buddha and peace (although he is also shown frequenting opium dens when he is depressed). Even at his lowest point, he still prevents his gambling companions from fighting.

Tea House of the August Moon (1956)
The original story of this film was from a novel version written by Vern Sneider in 1952. Tea House of the August Moon film version was adapted in 1956 from the play version in 1953, written by John Patrick. This American comedy film is directed by Daniel Mann. The plot is surrounded by the concept of the United States military government trying to establish power and influence over Japan, specifically in Okinawa, during wartime. Although the cast does include actual Japanese actors and actresses that fit the Japanese characters in the film, such as Machiko Kyō, Jun Negami, Nijiko Kiyokawa, and Mitsuko Sawamura, the main character, Sakini, is played by a white American actor, Marlon Brando.

Flower Drum Song (1961)
Flower Drum Song is a 1961 film adaptation of the 1958 Broadway play of the same title. This adaptation tells the story of a Chinese woman emigrating to the U.S. and her subsequent arranged marriage. This movie featured the first majority Asian cast in Hollywood cinema, setting a precedent for the following The Joy Luck Club and Crazy Rich Asians to have a majority Asian casting. It became the first major Hollywood feature film to have a majority Asian cast in a contemporary Asian-American story.

The Joy Luck Club (1993)
The Joy Luck Club is a 1993 American drama directed by Wayne Wang. The story is based the novel of the same name by Amy Tan. This movie explored the relationship of Chinese immigrant mothers and their first-generation Chinese-American daughters. This movie was only the second in Hollywood cinema to feature an Asian majority casting.

Better Luck Tomorrow (2002)
Better Luck Tomorrow is a 2002 American crime-drama film directed by Justin Lin. The film is about Asian American overachievers who become bored with their lives and enter a world of petty crime and material excess. Better Luck Tomorrow introduced film audiences to a cast including Parry Shen, Jason Tobin, Sung Kang, Roger Fan and John Cho.

Saving Face (2004) 
Saving Face is a 2004 American romantic comedy-drama film directed by Alice Wu. The film surrounds Wil (Michelle Krusiec) is a lesbian, but she is too afraid to tell her widowed mother Hwei-lan, (Joan Chen) or her strict grandparents. She is shocked to discover that her 48-year-old mother is pregnant, and that she is not the only member of her family with romantic secrets. Hwei-lan is kicked out of her parents' house and forced to live with Wil, straining Wil's growing friendship with the out and proud Vivian (Lynn Chen).

2010s in film

Gook (2017)
Gook tells the story of Asian Americans during the 1992 Los Angeles riots. It was released in 2017 with its director Justin Chon, David So, Sang Chon, Curtiss Cook Jr. and Ben Munoz.

Ghost in the Shell (2017) 
Ghost in the Shell is a 2017 American adaptation of the Japanese manga Ghost in the Shell by Masamune Shirow. It was directed by Rupert Sanders and featured Scarlett Johansson as the main character. This movie was set in the future and revolved around a story of a cyborg discovering her past. This film was controversial due to the fact that the casting featured a Caucasian with the movie being accused of racism and whitewashing in film. After the controversy erupted, it was reported that Paramount Pictures examined the possibility of using CGI to make Scarlett Johansson appear "more Asian".

Crazy Rich Asians (2018)
Crazy Rich Asians is a 2018 film adaptation of the book by the same name by Kevin Kwan. Despite being a critical and commercial success, the film received controversy over the casting of mixed race actors and non-Chinese actors in ethnically Chinese roles, as well as portraying the characters speaking British English and American English instead of Singaporean English. The movie was also criticized for its lack of diversity, with critics stating that the movie did not properly depict the variety of ethnic groups in Singapore. Lead actress Constance Wu responded to criticisms, stating that the film would not represent every Asian American given that the majority of characters depicted in the movie were ethnically Chinese and extremely wealthy. Time magazine also noted that the film was the "first modern story with an all-Asian cast and an Asian-American lead" since the release of the 1993 film The Joy Luck Club.

To All the Boys I've Loved Before (2018)
To All the Boys I've Loved Before is a 2018 Netflix Original movie based on the book by the same name by Jenny Han. The film stars Lana Condor and Noah Centineo and has been credited along with Crazy Rich Asians as helping to garner more representation for Asian Americans in film. Of the film, Han stated that she had to turn down initial offers to adapt the book, as some of the studios wanted a white actress to play the main character of Lara Jean. Ironically, none of the film adaptation of the romantic comedy's five male love interests were of Asian descent, despite changing the ethnicity of at least one love interest from the book, which was seen as a perpetuation of the emasculation of Asian men in Hollywood media.

The Farewell (2019)
The Farewell is a 2019 American comedy-drama film written and directed by Lulu Wang, based on a story called What You Don't Know that was initially shared by Wang on This American Life in April 2016. Based on Wang's life experiences, the film stars Awkwafina as Billi Wang, a Chinese American who upon learning her grandmother has only a short time left to live, is pressured by her family to not tell her while they schedule family gathering before she dies. The film received critical acclaim; the film was nominated for two awards at the 77th Golden Globe Awards including Best Foreign Language Film and Awkwafina winning for Best Actress – Musical or Comedy, making her the first person of Asian descent to win a Golden Globe Award in any lead actress film category.

2020s in film

The Half of It (2020)

The Half of It is a 2020 Netflix Original movie written and directed by Alice Wu. The Cyrano de Bergerac spin-off is about Ellie Chu, a shy, introverted student helps the school jock woo a girl whom, secretly, they both want. They find themselves connecting and learn about the nature of love.

Shang-Chi and the Legend of the Ten Rings (2021)
Shang-Chi and the Legend of the Ten Rings is a 2021 superhero film based on the Marvel Comics character Shang-Chi, produced by Marvel Studios and set in the Marvel Cinematic Universe. Starring Simu Liu as Shang-Chi and Tony Leung as Wenwu, the film is Marvel's first superhero movie tentpole franchise with an Asian protagonist. A film based on Shang-Chi was planned in 2006, but development did not begin in earnest until December 2018, following the success of Crazy Rich Asians. The film modernizes the problematic elements of Shang-Chi and the Mandarin's comic book origins, which depicted negative stereotypes of East Asians. According to producer Kevin Feige, Shang-Chi and the Legend of the Ten Rings features a cast that is "98% Asian" and is "much more than a kung fu movie."

Everything Everywhere All at Once (2022) 
Everything Everywhere All at Once is a 2022 film directed by Daniel Kwan and Daniel Scheinert (aka. The Daniels), and produced by A24. Starring Michelle Yeoh, Stephanie Hsu, Ke Huy Quan, James Hong, Harry Shum Jr., among other actors, it is an absurdist action-comedy film where an aging Chinese-American immigrant must save the world by exploring other universes and reliving the lives she could have led.

2010s television

Fresh Off the Boat (2015–2020) 

Fresh Off the Boat is an American sitcom created by Nahnatchka Khan, a loose adaptation of author Eddie Huang's Fresh off the Boat. This show followed the life of an Asian-American family in the early 1990s. It is the first Asian-American sitcom to be featured prime-time in America. It was released in February 2015 and has been renewed several times, ending with a two-part finale on February 21, 2020.

Dr. Ken (2015–2017) 

Dr. Ken is an American sitcom created by actor and writer Ken Jeong. This show followed the story of an Asian-American doctor and his family. This show aired between October 2, 2015, and March 31, 2017.

Kim's Convenience (2016–2021) 

Kim's Convenience is a Canadian TV series adapted from Ins Choi's 2011 play of the same name. This show revolves around the life of a family and their family-run convenience store located in Toronto. It debuted in October 2016 and has since been renewed for a fourth season. This show has been globally brought to attention with Netflix securing rights to broadcast it outside of Canada.

Warrior (2019–present) 
Warrior is an American action-drama television series executive-produced by Shannon Lee and Justin Lin, based on an original concept and treatment by Lee's father Bruce Lee. The show follows a martial arts prodigy and his involvement in the Tong Wars of 1870s San Francisco. Bruce Lee developed the show in 1971, but had trouble pitching it to Warner Bros. and Paramount. The show premiered on Cinemax on April 5, 2019, and was subsequently renewed for a second season.

Classic Hollywood cinema

Dr. Fu Manchu
In 1929, the character Dr. Fu Manchu made his American film debut in The Mysterious Dr. Fu Manchu played by the Swedish-American actor Warner Oland. Oland repeated the role in 1930s The Return of Dr. Fu Manchu and 1931's Daughter of the Dragon. Oland appeared in character in the 1931 musical Paramount on Parade where the Devil Doctor was seen to murder both Philo Vance and Sherlock Holmes.

In 1932, Boris Karloff took over the character in the film The Mask of Fu Manchu. The film's tone has long been considered racist and offensive, but that only added to its cult status alongside its humor and Grand Guignol sets and torture sequences. The film was suppressed for many years, but has since received critical re-evaluation and been released on DVD uncut.

Charlie Chan

In a series of films in the 1930s and 1940s, Chinese-Hawaiian-American detective Charlie Chan was played by white actors Warner Oland, Sidney Toler and Roland Winters. The Swedish-born Oland, unlike his two successors in the Chan role, actually looked somewhat Chinese, and according to his contemporaries, he did not use special makeup in the role. He also played East Asians in other films, including Shanghai Express, The Painted Veil, and Werewolf of London (decades later, Afro-European American TV actor Khigh Dhiegh, though of African and European descent, was generally cast as an East Asian because of his appearance, and he was often included on lists of East Asian actors).

The Good Earth

The Good Earth (1937) is a film about Chinese farmers who struggle to survive. It was adapted by Talbot Jennings, Tess Slesinger, and Claudine West from the play by Donald Davis and Owen Davis, which was itself based on the 1931 novel The Good Earth by Nobel Prize-winning author Pearl S. Buck. The film was directed by Sidney Franklin, Victor Fleming (uncredited) and Gustav Machatý (uncredited).

The film's budget was $2.8 million, relatively expensive for the time, and took three years to make. Although Pearl Buck intended the film to be cast with all Chinese or Chinese-American actors, the studio opted to use established American stars, tapping Europeans Paul Muni and Luise Rainer for the lead roles. Both had won Oscars the previous year: Rainer for her role in The Great Ziegfeld and Muni for the lead in The Story of Louis Pasteur. When questioned about his choice of the actors, producer Irving Thalberg responded by saying, "I'm in the business of creating illusions."

Anna May Wong had been considered a top contender for the role of O-Lan, the Chinese heroine of the novel. However, because Paul Muni was a white man, the Hays Code's anti-miscegenation rules required the actress who played his wife to be a white woman. So, MGM gave the role of O-Lan to a European actress and offered Wong the role of Lotus, the story's villain. Wong refused to be the only Chinese-American, playing the only negative character, stating: "I won't play the part. If you let me play O-Lan, I'll be very glad. But you're asking me—with Chinese blood—to do the only unsympathetic role in the picture featuring an all-American cast portraying Chinese characters." MGM's refusal to consider Wong for this most high-profile of Chinese characters in U.S. film is remembered today as "one of the most notorious cases of casting discrimination in the 1930s".

The Good Earth was nominated for five Academy Awards including Best Picture, Best Direction (Sidney Franklin), Best Cinematography (Karl Freund), and Best Film Editing (Basil Wrangell). In addition to the Best Actress award (Luise Rainer), the film won for Best Cinematography. The year The Good Earth came out, Wong appeared on the cover of Look magazine's second issue, which labeled her "The World's Most Beautiful Chinese Girl." Stereotyped in America as a dragon lady, the cover photo had her holding a dagger.

Breakfast at Tiffany's

The 1961 film Breakfast at Tiffany's has been criticized for its portrayal of the character Mr. Yunioshi, Holly's bucktoothed, stereotyped Japanese neighbor. Mickey Rooney wore makeup to change his features to a caricatured approximation of a Japanese person. In the 45th-anniversary-edition DVD release, producer Richard Shepherd repeatedly apologizes, saying, "If we could just change Mickey Rooney, I'd be thrilled with the movie". Director Blake Edwards stated, "Looking back, I wish I had never done it ... and I would give anything to be able to recast it, but it's there, and onward and upward". In a 2008 interview about the film, 87-year-old Rooney said he was heartbroken about the criticism and that he had never received any complaints about his portrayal of the character.

Sixteen Candles 
The 1984 American film Sixteen Candles has been criticized for the character of Long Duk Dong. This Asian character became an "Asian American stereotype for a new generation". Long Duk Dong displayed a variety of stereotypes in the film such being socially awkward and difficult to understand, and the "lecherous but sexually inept loser". The idea of Asians being more feminine and therefore "weaker" is further exemplified through Long Duk Dong's romantic relationship with one of the characters in the film. He assumes the more feminine role while the American girl becomes the more masculine of two in the relationship.

Theater
Yellowface in theatre has been called "the practice of white actors donning overdone face paint and costumes that serves as a caricatured representation of traditional Asian garb." Founded in 2011, the Asian American Performers Action Coalition (AAPAC) works in an effort to, "expand the perception of Asian American performers in order to increase their access to and representation on New York City's stages." This group works to address and discuss yellowface controversies and occurrences.

Miss Saigon

Miss Saigon, a musical with music by Claude-Michel Schönberg, lyrics by Alain Boublil and Richard Maltby Jr. and book by Boublil and Schönberg, is a modern adaptation of Giacomo Puccini's opera Madama Butterfly. Miss Saigon tells the story of a doomed romance involving a Vietnamese woman and an American soldier set in the time of the Vietnam War.

When Miss Saigon premiered at the Theatre Royal, Drury Lane, London, on September 20, 1989, Welsh actor Jonathan Pryce wore heavy prosthetic eyelids and skin darkening cream in playing The Engineer, a mixed-race French-Vietnamese pimp.

Once the London West End production came to Broadway in 1990, Pryce was slated to reprise his role as The Engineer, causing a major rift in American theater circles and sparking public outcry. Tony Award-winning playwright David Henry Hwang wrote a letter to the Actors' Equity Association protesting this portrayal of a Eurasian character being played by a White actor.

Despite these protests, Pryce performed the Engineer to great acclaim and Miss Saigon became one of Broadway's longest-running hits.

The Mikado

The Mikado, a comic operetta with music by Arthur Sullivan and libretto by W. S. Gilbert, premiered in 1885 in London and still performed frequently in the English-speaking world and beyond. In setting the opera in a fictionalized 19th-century Japan, Gilbert used the veneer of Far Eastern exoticism to soften the impact of his pointed satire of British institutions and politics.

Numerous 21st-century U.S. productions of The Mikado have been criticized for the use of yellowface in their casting: New York (2004 and 2015), Los Angeles (2007 and 2009), Boston (2007), Austin (2011), Denver (2013), and Seattle (2014) The press noted that the Seattle Gilbert & Sullivan Society cast the 10 principal roles and the chorus with white actors, with the exception of two Latino actors.

In 2015, the New York Gilbert and Sullivan Players cancelled a production of The Mikado that was set to feature their repertory company of mostly White actors, due to complaints from the East Asian-American community. The company redesigned its production in collaboration with an advisory group of East Asian-American theater professionals and debuted the new concept in 2016, receiving a warm review in The New York Times. After Lamplighters Music Theatre of San Francisco planned a 2016 production, objections by the East Asian-American community prompted them to re-set the operetta in Renaissance-era Milan, replacing all references to Japan with Milan. Reviewers felt that the change resolved the issue.

The King and I

The King and I is a musical by Richard Rodgers (composer) and Oscar von Hammerstein II (lyricist). Based on the 1944 novel Anna and the King of Siam by Margaret Landon, the story illustrates the clash of Eastern and Western cultures by relaying the experiences of Anna, a British schoolteacher hired as part of the King's drive to modernize his country. The relationship between the King and Anna is marked by conflict and constant bickering throughout the musical, as well as by a love that neither can confess.

The 2015 Dallas Summer Musicals' production of the musical caused controversy in the casting of a European-American actor as King Mongkut. In an open letter to Dallas Summer Musicals, the AAPAC criticized the choice, saying "the casting of a white King dramaturgically undermines a story about a clash between Western and Eastern cultures"; moreover, "Asian impersonation denies Asians our own subjecthood. It situates all the power within a Caucasian-centric world view."

Asian representation in American animated films

Bugs Bunny Nips the Nips (1944) 
Bugs Bunny Nips the Nips is an 8-minute animated short directed by Friz Freleng and produced through Warner Bros. Cartoons as part of the Merrie Melodies cartoon series. It portrays Japanese stereotypes of the Japanese Emperor and military, a sumo wrestler, and a geisha through Bugs Bunny and his interactions with a Japanese soldier on an island.

Siamese cats in Lady and the Tramp (1955) 
Lady and the Tramp is an animated musical film directed by Clyde Geronimi Wilfred Jackson. Voice actors include Peggy Lee, Barbara Luddy, Larry Roberts, Bill Thompson, Bill Baucon, Steve Freberg, Verna Felton, Alan Reed, George Givot, Dallas, McKennon, and Lee Millar. Although this animation is about dogs, the portrayal of the Siamese cats with buck-teeth and slanted eyes was criticized by many who believed that it was a racist representation of stereotypical Asians. The exaggerated accents were also mocking of the Thai language.

Mulan (1998) 
The animated film Mulan was produced by the Walt Disney Feature Animation for Walt Disney Pictures in 1998. It is based on an old traditional Chinese folktale about a young girl, Hua Mulan, who disguises as a man to take her father's spot in the army. It boasted international popularity and distribution. This film was so successful that in 2004 Mulan II, its sequel, was produced. However, this is not the first or only animation to adapt Mulan's story. In 1998, United American Video Entertainment produced an animation called The Secret of Mulan, that uses six-legged caterpillars to represent the characters in a friendlier way for young children.

Bao (2018) 
Bao is one of Pixar's animated shorts produced in 2018 and directed by Domee Shi. It portrays the importance of family and culture in the Chinese American community. The plot surrounds a story about a Chinese mother who creates a baby dumpling that comes to life to help her cope with the loneliness and grief in missing her son who has grown up.

Other examples in Western media

A prominent example of the whitewashing of Asian roles is the 1970s TV series, Kung Fu, in which the leading character—a Chinese monk and martial arts master who fled China after having accidentally slain the emperor's nephew—is portrayed by European-American actor, David Carradine. The film Dragon: The Bruce Lee Story describes to some extent the struggles that ensued when Hollywood moguls attempted to cast Bruce Lee in the starring role of Caine but were overruled. American actress Emma Stone played a half-Asian character in the film Aloha. In the film Cloud Atlas every major male character in the Korean story line was played by a non-Asian actor made up in yellowface makeup.

Michael Derrick Hudson, an American poet, used a Chinese female pen name.

See also

blackface in contemporary art
Covert racism
Racism in early American film
Reel Bad Arabs
Reel Injun
Whiteface (performance)

References

Further reading 

 Metzger, Sean. "Charles Parsloe's Chinese Fetish: An Example of Yellowface Performance in Nineteenth-Century American Melodrama." Theatre Journal 56, no. 4 (2004): 627–651. 
 
 
 
 
 Young, Cynthia Ann. "AfroAsian Encounters: Culture, History, Politics (review)." Journal of Asian American Studies 10, no. 3 (2007): 316–318. .

External links
 Hollywood Chinese, a 2007 documentary film about the portrayals of Chinese men and women in Hollywood productions
 "Yellowface: Asians on White Screens", by Yayoi Lena Winfrey, IM Diversity.com "A Certain Slant" by Robert B. Ito, Bright Lights Film Journal''
 "Monitoring Asians in the American mass media" at Asian American Media Watch
 "Asian Images in Film: Introduction" at TCM
 "Roundtable: The Past and Present of 'Yellowface'", at NPR

History of racism in the cinema of the United States
Cultural appropriation
Asian-American culture
Asian-American issues
Stereotypes of Asian Americans
Race-related controversies in film